Mbairamadji Dillah (born 18 September 1985) is a Chadian professional football player. He has made eight appearances for the Chad national football team.

Club career
Dillah won the Chadian championship in 2014 with club Foullah Edifice. After several Chadian clubs, Dillah joined Gabonese club O'Mbilia Nzami in 2014. He is right-footed.

International career
Although Dillah debuted for Chad in CEMAC 2013 tournament, as CEMAC matches are not considered FIFA official, his first official match for national team was against Malawi on 17 May 2014, which Chad lost 2–0. He was part of the team that won CEMAC 2014.

See also
 List of Chad international footballers

References

External links
 

1985 births
Living people
Chadian footballers
Chad international footballers
People from N'Djamena
Foullah Edifice FC players
Gazelle FC players
Tourbillon FC players
USM Libreville players
Association football goalkeepers
Chadian expatriate footballers
Expatriate footballers in Gabon
Chadian expatriate sportspeople in Gabon